Annamia is a small genus of gastromyzontid loaches native to Southeast Asia. There are two species, though one of them is of doubtful validity and identity:
 Annamia normani (Hora, 1931), found in the Mekong basin
 Annamia thuathienensis H. D. Nguyễn & V. H. Nguyễn, 2005, found in Vietnam (species inquirenda)

References

 

Gastromyzontidae
Fish of Asia